Zsuzsa Szabó (née Nagy; born 16 January 1940) is a retired Hungarian middle-distance runner. She competed at the 1964 Olympics in the 800 m and finished in fourth place. Two years later she won a gold and a silver medal in this event at the European indoor and outdoor championships, respectively.

References

External links 

 
 
 Zsuzsa Szabo (née Nagy) at Track and Field Statistics

1940 births
Living people
Hungarian female middle-distance runners
Olympic athletes of Hungary
Athletes (track and field) at the 1964 Summer Olympics
European Athletics Championships medalists
Sportspeople from Pécs